Jamno  is a part of the city Koszalin in West Pomeranian Voivodeship, in north-western Poland.

The village has a population of 530. Until 31 December 2009 it was a part of gmina Będzino.

References

Koszalin
Neighbourhoods in Poland